The Fortress of Dr. Radiaki is a first-person shooter developed by Maelstrom Software and Future Visionary. It was released in 1994 for DOS by Merit Studios. The game uses a 2.5D graphic engine, similar to the one used in Wolfenstein 3D. The game was exclusively re-released, alongside Command Adventures: Starship and Harvester, by Lee Jacobson on ZOOM-Platform.com for Windows, Mac and Linux on January 27, 2023.

Gameplay
The plot of the game is that a mad scientist named Dr. Radiaki is going to destroy the world if an amount of $1 billion is not deposited in his account. The player controls a special agent named Mack Banner, whose mission is to kill Dr. Radiaki. The objective of the game is to find the exit of each level in order to progress to the next, each level being infested with enemies that attack the player including guards, mutant monsters and robots, etc. To defend yourself, the game offers an arsenal of 7 different weapons. The player can find the weapons and ammunition in various spots throughout the levels. Some doors require a specific key in order to be opened. The keys also are found throughout the levels. The game also features boss battles in some levels.

Reception

Next Generation reviewed the game, rating it three stars out of five, and stated that "the game's incredible graphics and tongue-in-cheek cult-film atmosphere are sure to appeal to fans of other first-person shooters."

References

External links

DOS games
DOS-only games
First-person shooters
Video games with 2.5D graphics
1994 video games
Video games developed in the United States
Sprite-based first-person shooters
Single-player video games
Merit Studios games